Attila Decker (born 25 August 1987) is a  Hungarian male water polo player. He is part of the Hungary men's national water polo team. He won a gold medal at the 2013 World Championships. He is the younger brother of Ádám Decker water polo player.

Honours

National
 World Championships:  Gold medal - 2013;  Silver medal - 2017
 European Championship:  Gold medal - 2020;  Silver medal - 2014;  Bronze medal - 2008, 2016
 FINA World Cup:  Silver medal - 2014
 FINA World League:  Silver medal - 2013, 2014

Club
Eger (Brendon-Fenstherm-ZF-Eger)
 Hungarian Cup (1x): 2007
 LEN Cup runners-up: 2007–08

Szolnok (Szolnoki Dózsa-KÖZGÉP)
 Hungarian Championship (2x): 2014–15, 2015–16
 Hungarian Cup (1x): 2014

See also
 Hungary men's Olympic water polo team records and statistics
 List of men's Olympic water polo tournament goalkeepers
 List of world champions in men's water polo
 List of World Aquatics Championships medalists in water polo

References

External links
 

1987 births
Living people
Hungarian male water polo players
Water polo goalkeepers
Olympic water polo players of Hungary
Water polo players at the 2016 Summer Olympics
World Aquatics Championships medalists in water polo
Water polo players from Budapest